Gundavarapu Deviprasad Rao (born on 5 April 1958) is a Telangana State activist and Present Chairman For Telangana State Beverages Corporation Limited and Former President of Telangana Non-Gazetted Officers Association. He along with his union are at the forefront of Telangana Movement.

Early life
Deviprasad hails from Allipur village in Medak district. He was employed with the irrigation department. He did his schooling and graduation in Medak. his father was a great freedom fighter. his father name is Gundavaram Radhakishan rao and his mother name is vijayalaxmi. and elder sister name is Bharathi. and brother name is Rangarao.

Career
He joined Andhra Pradesh State Government in 1979 in Irrigation department. He was earlier the General Secretary of TNGO.

He is instrumental in TNGO's strike for the formation of Telangana state, Sakala Janula Samme.

Political career
He was invited to contest for MLC by the Chief Minister of Telangana, K Chandrashekhar Rao, owing to his active role in Telangana movement. He is contesting as MLC from Hyderabad Rangareddy Mahabubnagar graduates Constituency. TRS Party is supporting him.  He filed his nomination on 25 February 2015 with support of the TRS. He resigned from his government service for contesting in the MLC election 2015. He lost to his rival N.Ramachandra rao from BJP by a large margin of 13000 votes. Honorable CM Of Telangana Sri.KCR nominated as CHAIRMAN, BEVERAGES CORPORATION , telangana state.

Personal life
He is married and has two children. daughter name is SAHAJA and his son name is chaitanya kumar. his son chaitanya completed M.tec at German university.

References

Living people
Trade unionists from Telangana
People from Medak district
1958 births